Czechoslovakia first participated at the Olympic Games in 1918, after having competed as Bohemia from 1900 to 1912. The nation sent athletes to compete in every Summer Olympic Games since then, except for the 1984 Games when they were part of the Soviet-led boycott of the 1984 Summer Olympics.
Czechoslovakia has participated in every Winter Olympic Games since the inaugural Games of 1924.

After the dissolution of Czechoslovakia in 1993, the Czech Republic and Slovakia sent independent teams to the Olympics starting in 1994.

Czechoslovak athletes have won a total of 143 medals at the Summer Games, mostly in gymnastics. The nation also won 25 medals at the Winter Games, with ski jumping and ice hockey as the top medal-producing sports.

Participation

Timeline of participation

Medal tables

Medals by Summer Games

Medals by Winter Games

Medals by summer sport 

This table of summer sports does not include the bronze medal won in ice hockey at the 1920 Summer Olympics.

Medals by winter sport 

This table includes the bronze medal won in ice hockey at the 1920 Summer Olympics.

See also
 List of flag bearers for Czechoslovakia at the Olympics
 :Category:Olympic competitors for Czechoslovakia
 Czechoslovakia at the Paralympics

External links
 
 
 

 
Olympics